We Alright is the first single by hip-hop group Young Money Entertainment from their collaboration album Young Money: Rise of an Empire. It is performed by Young Money artists Euro and Lil Wayne and features Cash Money artist Birdman.
The song was released on January 22, 2014.

Music video
The Colin Tilley-directed music video was released on February 15, 2014. The video features cameo appearances from multiple members of Young Money.

Track listing
 Digital single

Charts

References

2014 singles
2014 songs
Cash Money Records singles
Lil Wayne songs
Songs written by Birdman (rapper)
Songs written by Lil Wayne
Young Money Entertainment singles

Songs written by S-X
Song recordings produced by S-X